Kocaeli Büyükşehir Belediyesi Kağıt Spor Kulübü is an ice hockey team in İzmit, Turkey. They play in the Turkish Ice Hockey Super League, the highest level of Turkish ice hockey. The team plays its home games at Kocaeli B.B. Ice Arena, which has a seating capacity of 3,600 people.

History

The Kocaeli ice hockey team was founded in 2000, and finished second place against Police Academy and College in the 2003–04, 2004–05 and 2005–06 Turkish Ice Hockey Super League seasons. In the 2006–07 season, they defeated Police Academy, and finally won their first Super League title. In the 2007–08 and 2008–09 seasons, they lost in the final to Police Academy for the fifth time in five years. In the 2010–11 season, the team was defeated by Başkent Yıldızları and achieved second place in the final.

The team appeared in the 2007–08 IIHF Continental Cup. They were paired with SC Miercurea Ciuc, KHL Mladost Zagreb and CG Puigcerdà. They defeated Puigcerda 5–4, and hence brought home Turkey's first win in the IIHF Continental Cup, while still not passing the preliminary stage.

Achievements
Turkish champion: 2007.
Turkish runner-up: 2004, 2005, 2006, 2008.

External links
Official site

Ice hockey teams in Turkey
Ice hockey
Ice hockey clubs established in 2000
Turkish Ice Hockey Super League teams
2000 establishments in Turkey